Mohamed Mallahi (born 13 February 2000) is a Dutch professional footballer who plays as a forward for Roda JC, on loan from FC Utrecht.

Club career
Mallahi played for USV Elinkwijk before joining the FC Utrecht youth academy at age 11. He made his debut for the reserve team Jong FC Utrecht on 24 November 2017 in the 4–2 loss to Almere City in the Eerste Divisie, after coming on for Nick Venema in the 73rd minute. He scored his first goal in professional football on 23 December 2017 in the match against Fortuna Sittard.

As of the 2018–19 season, Mallahi was officially promoted from the youth academy to Jong FC Utrecht. On 27 September 2018, Mallahi was on the bench of FC Utrecht for the KNVB Cup match against MVV Maastricht. Head coach Dick Advocaat did not substitute him on during the match.

On 25 September 2021, Mallahi made his debut for the first team in a 5–1 win in the Eredivisie over PEC Zwolle. He came on as a substitute for Moussa Sylla in the 78th minute.

Mallahi was sent on a one-season loan to Roda JC Kerkrade on 12 July 2022.

International career
Mallahi is a Netherlands youth international, and was part of the Netherlands under-17 team during the qualifiers for the 2018 UEFA European Under-17 Championship.

Personal life
Mallahi was born in the Netherlands and is of Moroccan descent.

References

2000 births
Living people
Dutch footballers
Dutch sportspeople of Moroccan descent
Association football forwards
Netherlands youth international footballers
Eerste Divisie players
Eredivisie players
USV Elinkwijk players
Jong FC Utrecht players
FC Utrecht players
Roda JC Kerkrade players